Göran Marström (born 12 October 1942) is a former Swedish sailor who competed in four Summer Olympics. Marström won a bronze medal in the Tornado class at the 1980 Summer Olympics together with Jörgen Ragnarsson.

References

Swedish male sailors (sport)
Sailors at the 1980 Summer Olympics – Tornado
Sailors at the 1984 Summer Olympics – Tornado
Sailors at the 1988 Summer Olympics – Tornado
Sailors at the 1992 Summer Olympics – Tornado
Olympic sailors of Sweden
Olympic bronze medalists for Sweden
Olympic medalists in sailing
1942 births
Living people
Linköpings Jolleseglarklubb sailors
Medalists at the 1980 Summer Olympics